Ismaïl Khelil (11 July 1932 – 20 November 2017) was a Tunisian politician.

Biography 
After studying at the University of Grenoble, where he obtained a license, he worked as a secretary at the Tunisian embassy in Rome from 1957 to 1960 and then as an advisor at the Tunisian embassy in Washington until 1964. He then became mayor of Gafsa (1966-1969) and ambassador of Tunisia in London (1969-1972) and Brussels (1972-1978), then director general of international cooperation at the Ministry of Foreign Affairs (1978-1979). He also directed the airline Tunisair between 1979 and 1980 and joined the World Bank as executive director between 1980 and 1984.

He occupied the functions of Minister of Planning between June 18, 1983 and October 27, 1987 and Minister of Finance between July 8, 1986 and October 27, 1987, in a difficult economic climate caused by the indebtedness then known the country . He hands over his portfolios following a government reshuffle initiated by the new Prime Minister Zine el-Abidine Ben Ali.

He was then appointed governor of the Central Bank of Tunisia, a position he retains upon Ben Ali's accession to the presidency of the Tunisia until 3 March 1990. He then briefly served as minister of finance. Foreign Affairs from March 3 to August 28, 1990. He then became Ambassador of Tunisia to the United States on March 6, 1991.

After completing his responsibilities in Washington in 1994, he worked in the private sector, as an adviser to Amen Bank and as chairman of the board of the Mediterranean Insurance and Reinsurance Company.

In Washington, he was elected member of the Cosmos Club.

References

1932 births
2017 deaths
People from Gafsa Governorate
Socialist Destourian Party politicians
Government ministers of Tunisia
Foreign ministers of Tunisia
Finance ministers of Tunisia
Ambassadors of Tunisia to the United States
Governors of the Central Bank of Tunisia